In functional analysis, a branch of mathematics, the ultraweak topology, also called the weak-* topology, or weak-*  operator topology or σ-weak topology, on the set B(H) of bounded operators on a Hilbert space is the weak-* topology obtained from the predual B*(H) of B(H), the trace class operators on H. In other words it is the weakest topology such that all elements of the predual are continuous (when considered as functions on B(H)).

Relation with the weak (operator) topology

The ultraweak topology is similar to the weak operator topology. 
For example, on any norm-bounded set the weak operator and ultraweak topologies 
are the same, and in particular the unit ball is compact in both topologies. The ultraweak topology is stronger than the weak operator topology.  

One problem with the weak operator topology is that the dual of B(H) with the weak operator topology is  "too small". The ultraweak topology fixes this problem: the dual is the full predual B*(H) of all trace class operators. In general the ultraweak topology is more useful than the weak operator topology, but it is more complicated to define, and the weak operator topology is often more apparently convenient. 

The ultraweak topology can be obtained from the weak operator topology as follows. 
If  H1 is a separable infinite dimensional Hilbert space
then B(H) can be embedded in B(H⊗H1) by tensoring with the identity map on H1. Then the restriction of the weak operator topology on  B(H⊗H1) is the ultraweak topology of B(H).

See also

 Topologies on the set of operators on a Hilbert space
 Ultrastrong topology
 Weak operator topology

References

  
  
  

Topology of function spaces
Von Neumann algebras